Vladimir Bogolyubov (born 6 October 1954) is a former pair skater who represented the Soviet Union with Marina Leonidova. Coached by Tamara Moskvina and Tatiana Tarasova, they were three-time Prize of Moscow News bronze medalists and two-time Soviet national bronze medalists. The pair placed fourth at the 1975 European Championships in Copenhagen and fifth at the 1975 World Championships in Colorado Springs, Colorado. They also competed at the 1976 Winter Olympics in Innsbruck and finished ninth. 

Bogolyubov later moved to the United States. He is a figure skating coach in Voorhees Township, New Jersey.

Competitive highlights 
(with Leonidova)

1974 Spartakiada results were used for Soviet Nationals results

References 

1954 births
Soviet male pair skaters
Soviet emigrants to the United States
Living people
Figure skaters at the 1976 Winter Olympics
Olympic figure skaters of the Soviet Union